The Bertone Suagnà is a concept car developed by Bertone in 2007 and based on the Fiat Grande Punto.

References

"Ultimate Car Page"

Suagna